The Pharmacist may refer to:

 The Pharmacist (1933 film), American film
 The Pharmacist (1997 film), German film
 The Pharmacist (TV series), 2020 American docuseries